The 1819 Rann of Kutch earthquake occurred at about 18:45 to 18:50 local time on 16 June. It had an estimated magnitude ranging from 7.7 to 8.2 on the moment magnitude scale and a maximum perceived intensity of XI (Extreme) on the Mercalli intensity scale. It triggered a tsunami and caused at least 1,543 deaths. The earthquake caused an area of subsidence that formed the Sindri Lake and a local zone of uplift to the north about 80 km long, 6 km wide and 6 m high that dammed the Koree / Kori / Puran / Nara river. This natural dam was known as the Allah Bund ("Dam of God").

Tectonic setting
The Kutch District of modern-day Gujarat lies 300–400 km from the plate boundary between the Indian Plate and the Eurasian Plate, but the current tectonics is still governed by the effects of the continuing continental collision along this boundary. During the break-up of Gondwana in the Jurassic period, this area was affected by rifting with a roughly west–east trend. During the collision with Eurasia the area has undergone shortening, involving both reactivation of the original rift faults and development of new low-angle thrust faults. The related folding has formed a series of ranges, particularly in central Kutch. The focal mechanism of most earthquakes is consistent with reverse faulting on reactivated rift faults. The 2001 Gujarat earthquake was caused by movement on a previously unknown south-dipping fault, trending parallel to the inferred rift structures.

Earthquake
The earthquake lasted for two to three minutes. It was felt over an enormous area, from Chennai to Kolkata in the east, as far north as Kathmandu and as far west as Balochistan.
The mainshock was followed by prolonged aftershock activity, with major earthquakes continuing for at least 50 years, including one with estimated magnitude of more than 6.5 in 1846.

Maximum displacement during the earthquake is estimated at 12 m, based on the height of the bund and the amount of subsidence to the south. Combined with a lateral extent of at least 80 km, this gives an estimated moment magnitude of 7.7±0.2. This matches well with magnitudes estimated using both the total felt area and the area of VIII intensity. Other estimates based on intensity measurements give magnitudes as high as 8.2.

Modelling of the surface deformation indicates that the fault that slipped during the earthquake dipped to the north at between about 50–67°. As faults that dip in excess of 50° are normally unfavourable for slip, it has been suggested that there was relatively high pore-fluid pressure developed at depth to allow this displacement to occur. There is evidence that the Indus river shifted westwards after this earthquake.

Allah Bund

The most obvious topographic effect of this earthquake was the formation of a ridge about 6 m high, extending for 80 km (possibly as much as 150 km) that formed a natural dam across the Puran river. To distinguish it from the man-made dams that were common in the region, the uplifted area became known as the Allah Bund, or Dam of God. The mound produced had a markedly asymmetric geometry, with a shorter and steeper south-dipping margin, about 600 m wide and a dip of 0.65°, and a broader north-dipping margin over 5 km wide with a dip of only about 0.05°.

Sindri Lake
Sindri Lake, with a surface area of more than 1,000 km2, was formed due to subsidence of up to 3 m south of the Allah Bund. Initially, the lake was cut off from the river (damming further upstream had stopped the flow) and was filled with seawater. On the western margin of the lake a small delta built out from the eastern part of the larger Indus Delta. After 1826 the river broke through the artificial dam and eventually broke through the bund itself, causing the lake to become freshwater again.

Later earthquakes
The 1956 Anjar earthquake was  due to reverse faulting, similar in type to that which is thought to have caused the 1819 Rann of Kutch earthquake.

Changes in stress caused by coulomb stress transfer due to the 1819 earthquake may have been sufficient to trigger the 2001 Bhuj earthquake and other historic earthquakes that occurred in the region during the intervening period.

Tsunami
There was a local tsunami that flooded the area known as the Great Rann immediately after the earthquake. The fort at Sindri was destroyed by the earthquake and then partly submerged by the tsunami, "forcing survivors to climb to the top of the ruins".

Damage
The towns of Kothara, Mothala, Naliya and Vinzan suffered particularly heavy damage. Anjar, Bhuj, Lakhpat, Mandvi and Tera were also severely affected. At least 1,543 people were killed in the larger towns; the number of casualties in smaller towns and villages is unknown. There was some degree of damage to buildings over most of Gujarat, including the destruction of the "shaking minarets" of the Jama Masjid in Ahmedabad. At Jaisalmer in Rajasthan, "at least 500 guests were smothered at a wedding feast".

See also
 List of earthquakes in India
 List of historical earthquakes
 List of historical tsunamis

References

1819 Rann
1819 earthquakes
Kutch district
History of Gujarat
1819 in India
History of Kutch
1819 Rann
19th-century tsunamis
June 1819 events
1819 disasters in India